Pavel Yurievich Derevyanko (born 2 July 1976) is a Russian theatre and film actor.

Biography
Pavel Derevyanko was born in the city of Taganrog, Rostov Oblast, Russian SFSR, Soviet Union. His parents, Yuri Pavlovich and Tatiana Vasilievna Derevyanko, worked all their life at a factory in Taganrog.

He studied in Kiev, Ukrainian SSR. Afterwards, Pavel moved to Moscow where he entered the Russian Academy of Theatre Arts. He studied there from 1996 until 2000. He was noticed by director Alexander Kott as a sophomore of the GITIS (course of Leonid Kheyfets) when Pavel with other students staged the performance Overstocked Packaging Barrels. When Alexander Kott began shooting his film Two Chauffeurs were Driving, he tracked down Derevyanko. At that time Pavel was rehearsing in Oleg Menshikov's theatrical project "Kitchen", but he did not wish to refuse the proposal of Alexander Kott to star in a film. The film Two Chauffeurs were Driving was warmly received by the audience, and the role of Kolka Snegirev brought the beginning actor his first fame.

The young actor appeared then in the following films - Nine Lives of Nestor Makhno (2006), Antikiller 2 and the TV series Strafbat.

Derevyanko is also well-known for acting in the comedies Hitler goes Kaput! (2008) and Rzhevsky versus Napoleon (2012).

In 2013, the actor was nominated for the Golden Eagle Award for Best Actor in Television for the role of Mikhail Solovyov in the television series The Dark Side of the Moon.

In the spring of 2015, he acted in the music video of Vasil Oblomov for the song "Mnogochodovochka". In the fall of 2015, a clip of the group Uma2rman "Toxins" with Pavel was released.

He starred in a lead role (Peter III) in the TV series Catherine the Great (2015), along with Yuliya Snigir (Catherine II).

Career

Theatre roles
 «Затоваренная бочкотара» — Volodya Teleskopov
 Roberto Zucco (play by Bernard-Marie Koltès — Roberto Zucco
 The Overcoat — Akaky Akakievich Bashmachkin
 «Герой» — Кристофер Мехоун
 «Имаго pigmalionum» — Colonel Pikkering
 The Master and Margarita — Behemoth cat
 «Би-фем» — Mother
 Viy (story) — Khoma Brut

Filmography

 2001 Ехали два шофёра / We drove two chauffeur as Kolya
 2001 Ростов-Папа / Rostov-Pope (TV series)
 2001 Смеситель / Dlender as Efrosinya
 2002 По ту сторону волков / On the side Volkov (TV series)  as Volodya
 2002 Ледниковый период / Ice Age (TV series) as operas Zhenya Chistyakov
 2003 Участок / The site (TV series) as paramedic Vadik
 2003 Стилет / Stiletto (TV series) as Kolya "Bochka"
 2003 Родина ждёт / Homeland waiting (TV series) as Morshansky Jr.
 2003 Как бы не так / Like fun (TV)
 2003 Француз / Frenchman as a fellow traveler on train
 2003 Бабуся / Granny as each Viti
 2004 Женщины в игре без правил / Women in a game without rules (TV series) as Vitka Korshunov
 2004 Штрафбат / Shtrafbat (TV series) as Chypa
 2005 Взять Тарантину / Vzyat Tarantinu as Gosha
 2005 Анна / Anna as Nikolay Romanov
 2005 The Case of "Dead Souls" (TV series) as Bashmachkin, Schiller, Chichikov
 2005 Yesenin as Alexei Ganin
 2005 Люби меня / Love me as Shura, Mara
 2005 Shadowboxing (2005 film) as Timokha
 2006 Девять жизней Нестора Махно / Nine Lives of Nestor Makhno as Nestor Makhno
 2006 Заколдованный участок / Enchanted land - Vadik
 2007 Неваляшка / Roly-poly toy (film) as Ivan Zhukov "Roly-poly toy"
 2007 Shadowboxing 2: Revenge as Timokha
 2007 Attack on Leningrad (TV series) as Terekhin
 2007 Revenge
 2007 Кука / Cook as Serega
 2007 Беглянки / Fugitives as Venya
 2007 Громовы. Дом надежды / Gromov. House of Hope as Derevo
 2008 Братья Карамазовы / The Brothers Karamazov (TV series) as Pavel Smerdyakov
 2008 Плюс один / Plus one (film) as bunny
 2008 Hitler goes Kaput! as Olaf Shurenberg / Shura Osechkin
 2009 На море! / On the sea! as Pasha
 2009 Кошечка / Cat as a guest at a wedding
 2010 Счастливый конец / Happy End as stripper Pasha Davydenko
 2010 Love in the Big City 2 as guard sports body
 2010 Любовь под прикрытием / Love undercover - Gera
 2010 Fortress of War as Regimental Commissar Fomin
 2010 Утомлённые солнцем 2 / Burnt by the Sun 2 as legless soldier fiance
 2010 Я не я / I'm not myself as singer
 2010 Самка / The female as militiaman
 2010 Всем скорбящим радость / All the Afflicted as Stepan
 2012 Rzhevsky versus Napoleon as Poruchik Rzhevsky
 2012 The Dark Side of the Moon (TV series) as Mikhail Solovev
 2012 В гостях у Sкаzки / Away Sкаzki
 2013 The Thaw as Gennady Budnik, actor
 2013 Чёрные кошки / Black Cats as Egor Dragun
 2014 Тальянка / Talianki (TV series) as Vasily Stalin
 2014 Неваляшка-2 / Roly-poly toy 2 (film) as Ivan Zhukov "Roly-poly toy"
 2014 Смешанные чувства / Mixed feelings as Petr
 2015 Кровавая леди Батори / Lady of Csejte as Atilla
 2015 Catherine the Great (TV series) as Peter III of Russia
 2016 Friday as Gannadiy Antonov
 2017 Salyut-7 (film) as Viktor Alyokhin, cosmonaut
 2018 Gogol. The Beginning as Alexander Pushkin
 2018 Gogol. Terrible Revenge as Alexander Pushkin
 2018 Night Shift as Sergei
 2021 The Riot as Vitya

References

External links

 
  Official web site

Actors from Taganrog
Russian male stage actors
Russian male television actors
Russian male film actors
21st-century Russian male actors
1976 births
Living people
Male actors from Moscow